A list of films produced in Argentina in 1990:

External links and references
 Argentine films of 1990 at the Internet Movie Database

1990
Argentine
Films